The Cucurbitariaceae are a family of fungi in the order Pleosporales. Taxa are widespread in temperate regions and are necrotrophic or saprobic on woody plants.

References

Pleosporales